The 1973 UTEP Miners football team was an American football team that represented the University of Texas at El Paso in the Western Athletic Conference during the 1973 NCAA Division I football season. In their second year under head coach Tommy Hudspeth, the team compiled a 0–11 record.

Schedule

References

UTEP
UTEP Miners football seasons
College football winless seasons
UTEP Miners football